Bratan Tsenov (born 7 January 1964) is a Bulgarian former wrestler who competed in the 1988 Summer Olympics, in the 1992 Summer Olympics, and in the 1996 Summer Olympics.

References

External links
 

1964 births
Living people
Olympic wrestlers of Bulgaria
Wrestlers at the 1988 Summer Olympics
Wrestlers at the 1992 Summer Olympics
Wrestlers at the 1996 Summer Olympics
Bulgarian male sport wrestlers
Olympic bronze medalists for Bulgaria
Olympic medalists in wrestling
People from Lukovit
Medalists at the 1988 Summer Olympics
20th-century Bulgarian people
21st-century Bulgarian people